Hank Williams Jr.'s Greatest Hits – Volume 2 is an album by American country music singer and songwriter Hank Williams Jr. The Album was issued by MGM Records as number SE 4822.

Track listing

Side one
 Rainin' in My Heart – 2:56 (James Moore/Jerry West)
 After All They All Used To Belong To Me. Sung with the Mike Curb Congregation – 2:28
 So Sad (To Watch Good Love Go Bad). Sung with Lois Johnson – 2:50
 A-eee – 2:50
 Ain't That A Shame. Sung with the Mike Curb Congregation – 2:18

Side two
 All For the Love of Sunshine. Sung with the Mike Curb Congregation – 3:52
 I've Learned to Take the Hurtin' – 2:32
 Removing the Shadow. Sung with Lois Johnson – 2:58
 I Walked Out On Heaven – 2:32
 I've Got A Right to Cry – 2:31

External links
 Official website of Hank Williams Jr.

1972 greatest hits albums
Hank Williams Jr. compilation albums
MGM Records compilation albums